is a Japanese ice hockey player for Mitsuboshi Daito Perigrine and the Japanese national team. She participated at the 2015 IIHF Women's World Championship.

References

1996 births
Living people
Japanese women's ice hockey defencemen
Competitors at the 2017 Winter Universiade
Olympic ice hockey players of Japan
Ice hockey players at the 2022 Winter Olympics